The English Men's Volleyball League is the major volleyball national competition for men in England, established in 1977. It is organised by the English Volleyball Association (EVA).

Competition Format (Super League) 
The teams get 3 points for a 3:0 or 3:1 victory, 2 points for a 3:2 victory, 1 point for a 2:3 defeat, and 0 points for a 0:3 or 1:3 defeat.

Competition History
In the 2018/19 in the Super League 9 teams has participated: "Polonia London (London), Durham Palatineights (Durham), Wessex (Bournemouth), Essex Blaze (Colchester), Sheffield Hallam (Sheffield), "Mallory Eagles (London), Richmond Docklands (Richmond), Southampton, Newcastle Staffs. The championship title won the Polonia London. 2nd place went to Durham Palatineities, 3rd place to Wessex.

Winners list

References

External links
The English Volleyball Association 

England
Volleyball in England
Professional sports leagues in the United Kingdom